Philocteanus is a genus of beetles in the family Buprestidae, containing the following species:

 Philocteanus buphthalmus Thomson, 1878
 Philocteanus capitatus Kerremans, 1893
 Philocteanus elegans Théry, 1898
 Philocteanus harmandi Kerremans, 1908
 Philocteanus humeralis Obenberger, 1928
 Philocteanus incisifrons Théry, 1923
 Philocteanus laticollis Kurosawa, 1982
 Philocteanus leucophthalmus (Laporte & Gory, 1835)
 Philocteanus maitlandi Lansberge, 1883
 Philocteanus malayicus Kurosawa, 1982
 Philocteanus moricii Fairmaire, 1878
 Philocteanus plutus (Laporte & Gory, 1835)
 Philocteanus rubroaureus (DeGeer, 1778)
 Philocteanus strandi Obenberger, 1932
 Philocteanus subcupreus Kerremans, 1896

References

Buprestidae genera